Ettimadai is a suburb of Coimbatore in the state of Tamilnadu, India. Ettimadai is located between Palakkad and Coimbatore along the Salem - Kochi Highway (NH544) (old NH 47) close to Tamil Nadu - Kerala border. Ettimadai Town panjayat is one of the fast-growing south-western suburbs of Coimbatore. The renowned Amrita Vishwa Vidyapeetham University, along with its schools are situated here. There are other colleges such as Venkateshwara College of Business and Computer Applications, Nehru group of institution, Narayanana guru college of arts and technology.

Location
Ettimadai as a suburb encloses other small villages, namely K.G Chavadi, ChinnayaGounden Pudhur, Muruganpatti, Solakkarai and Modamaatti. Ettimadai is well known for its natural scenic beauty of mountain ranges since it is located along the foothills of the western Ghats.

Transport
Ettimadai has a railway station. All passenger trains running between Coimbatore Junction and  Palakkad stop here (via Podanur Junction).

Ettimadai is connected to other places of the city by the following bus routes:

A3 - Gandhipuram bus terminus to ettimadai railway station (Amrita University Main Gate)
S2 -  K.G. Chavadi to Uppilipalayam bus terminal (via Ettimadai)
3G - Ganapathy to K.G. Chavadi (via Ettimadai) 
48 - Gandhipuram bus terminal to Velanthaavalam (via Ettimadai) 
96 - connects this place with Gandhipuram bus terminal to Walayar (via Ettimadai)

Demographics

 India census, Ettimadai had a population of 7887. Males constitute 51% of the population and females 49%. Ettimadai has an average literacy rate of 56%, lower than the national average of 59.5%: male literacy is 65%, and female literacy is 46%. In Ettimadai, 13% of the population is under 6 years of age.
A significant number of people migrated to southern Erode in the late 18th century.

References

Suburbs of Coimbatore